Chris Spendlove (born 18 December 1984) is an English former footballer.

Career

Youth, college, and amateur
As a schoolboy Spendlove played football for Everton and Preston North End. He was a five-year captain of district and regional representative squads back in his home town of Liverpool before he began his Undergraduate and master's degrees at Oklahoma City University, playing with their soccer team during his four years there, recording 26 goals and 9 assists.

During his college career, Spendlove also played with USL Premier Development League club GPS Portland Phoenix during their 2010 season.

Professional
Spendlove signed his first professional contract in February 2011, joining USL Pro club Wilmington Hammerheads. He made his professional debut on 17 April 2011, in Wilmington's first game of the 2011 season, a 1–0 win over the Rochester Rhinos.

Prior to the 2020 USL Championship season, Spendlove became the assistant coach at Miami FC.

Personal
In December 2014, Spendlove was arrested and charged with the murder of a police officer and two counts of malicious wounding in Liverpool, England. On 22 December, Oklahoma City Energy dismissed him as a result.

During the subsequent murder trial at Liverpool Crown Court, it was alleged that Spendlove had struck PC Steventon whilst he was on the floor. CCTV was released by Merseyside Police following the trial which appears to show the alleged punch. Spendlove was accused of watching out for his two friends whilst they attacked the officers.

In July 2015 he was cleared of all charges, while his two co-defendants were convicted.

References

External links
 Oklahoma City University profile

Living people
1984 births
English footballers
Footballers from Liverpool
Association football defenders
Oklahoma City Stars men's soccer players
Austin Aztex U23 players
GPS Portland Phoenix players
Wilmington Hammerheads FC players
Oklahoma City FC players
North West Counties Football League players
USL League Two players
USL Championship players
English expatriate footballers
Expatriate soccer players in the United States
English expatriate sportspeople in the United States
Oklahoma State Cowgirls soccer coaches
OKC Energy FC coaches
Hartford Athletic coaches
Miami FC coaches
People acquitted of murder
English football managers
English expatriate football managers
Expatriate soccer managers in the United States